Bit Baḫiani was an independent Aramean city-state kingdom (c. 1200 – 808 BC) with its capital at Guzana (modern day Tell Halaf). Bit Baḫiani was ruled by King Kapara. There were at least five kings and four governors of Bit Baḫiani before losing its name in usage.

See also
 Halaf culture

References

Aramean cities
Ancient Syria
Aramean states
Syro-Hittite states